Nicholas VI (February 1913 – July 10, 1986) served as Greek Orthodox Patriarch of Alexandria between 1968 and 1986.

References

20th-century Greek Patriarchs of Alexandria
1913 births
1986 deaths